Sheki halva, or pakhlava, is a type of dessert specific to the Sheki region of Azerbaijan.

Origin 
Although Sheki halva has its own recipe and characteristics, this type of halva is thought to have originated in ancient Mesopotamia.

There are some stories known in Sheki regarding Sheki halva's origins. According to one, it was prepared by cooks of the Sheki khan who loved sweet desserts and ordered to make something very sweet. As a result, the cooks prepared Sheki halva and it became very popular in this region. Another story assumes that the origins of this halva came from Tabriz as Mashadi Huseyn, a merchant from Tabriz, came to Sheki and informed local merchants about the recipe of halva.

Preparation 

Sheki pakhlava has three main parts: rishta, stuffing and syrup. The main ingredients are rice flour, sugar, peeled hazelnuts, coriander seeds, cardamom, and saffron.

One of the specific requirements for Sheki pakhlava is to use rice flour ground only in a water mill. The other characteristic is containing grid-shaped rishta made by pouring kneaded dough onto a hot griddle through a special funnel with eleven holes and baking it in a minute. 

Stuffing is made of crumbled hazelnuts, ground cardamom and coriander seeds. After placing 8–10 rishta layers on a round copper tray, the stuffing is added and then it is covered with 5–10 rishta layers. The top layer is decorated with saffron in a square shape reminiscent of shabaka. It is generally baked over charcoal for 10–20 minutes. Hot sherbet syrup is poured on Sheki halva before leaving it to rest over 8–10 hours.

See also 

 Sheki 
 Azerbaijani pakhlava

References 

Azerbaijani desserts
Shaki, Azerbaijan
Halva